Matt Bish (born 15 May 1975), also known as Matthew Bishanga, is a Ugandan filmmaker and the Creative Director at Bish Films. He directed the first Ugawood feature film, Battle of the Souls, in 2007.

Personal life and education
The first of four children born to Mr. and Mrs. Douglas Bishanga, Bish obtained his early education in Uganda. There, as a boy, he grew to love film, attending the cinema but also being exposed to many movies at home with his family on his father's home video system. He credits his parents with inspiring his film career. After his primary education, he attended Makerere University in Kampala, where he studied architecture, before moving to the Netherlands in 1998 and studying digital filmmaking at the SAE Institute in Amsterdam.

Career
In 2005, Bish returned to Uganda to start an audiovisual production company "Bish Films Ltd" with his younger brother Roger Mugisha. At first limited to music videos, it soon branched out into films. Bish worked on his first feature film in 2006. Battle of the Souls is the first feature film in Uganda.

Bish Films produces TV commercials and documentaries, as well as films and music videos as they did when they first began. He believes Ugandan films that try to maintain quality should not be categorised as kina-Uganda (like ki-Nigeria) but rather Nile Films, Ugawood or something else.

"A critic is someone who can't do what you do the way you do it..." - Matt Bish

Filmography

 Short films

 Documentaries

References

1975 births
Living people
Ugandan film directors
Ugandan film producers
Place of birth missing (living people)
Ugandan screenwriters